"Stereo" is a single by the band Pavement, taken from the album Brighten the Corners.  It was released by Domino Records in 1997.  The catalogue number for the single is RUG-051. It contains two B-sides: "Westie Can Drum" and "Winner of The." It was released at the same time as the 7" version of the single, which contains a different B-side. It is the first track on Matador's 10th Anniversary compilation.
NME ranks the song as the 15th best song of 1997.

Some CDs contain the 7" B-side "Birds in the Majic Industry".

Composition and lyrics 
The song's lyrics make several references to pop culture icons.
 The repeated line "Hi-Ho Silver, Ride" in the chorus is a reference to The Lone Ranger's catchphrase.
 Part of the second verse muses about Rush lead singer Geddy Lee's distinctive high-pitched vocal stylings.

Track listing

Select pressings

References

External links
Allmusic [ review]
Robert Christgau review

1997 singles
Pavement (band) songs
Songs written by Stephen Malkmus
1997 songs
Domino Recording Company singles